Ruby Bones are an American rock band from New Jersey.

History
Chris Fox is a former member of the New Brunswick, New Jersey band Boxed Wine, who are called "exuberant pop-rock." They released two singles, two EPs and a full length album. When Boxed Wine disbanded, Fox began by writing folk songs, and in 2015, he was joined by drummer James Janocha of the band Twin Berlin, and bassist FC Spies to reinterpret his compositions as rock anthems, which formed the indie rock group Ruby Bones. They are noted as being a "formidable pop-rock engine".

Their self-titled album was released on 12 May 2017, and it charted on the Billboard Heatseeker Middle Atlantic Chart at  No. 7. It also was No. 16 on the Most Added NACC radio charts, and peaked at No. 175 on the Top 200. Regarding their self-titled album, Fox explains that it "is part love story, part dealing with the fact that technology and cell phones are so ubiquitous that it's making it harder to make real connection with someone," and continues by saying "people are addicted to this never-ending feed of information." Their video for the single "Gone Gone Gone" features actors Ryan Christian and Natalie Stevens. The music video pays homage to the film Weekend at Bernie's.

Members
Chris Fox – vocals and guitar (2015–present)
James Janocha – drums (2015–present)
FC Spies – bass (2015–2021)
Matt Cohen – lead guitar (2019–present)
Eric Vydel - bass (2022-present)

Discography

Albums
Laser Tooth Tiger(2021)
Press Rewind // Faster(2021)
Drink All Night(2021)
Tooth(2019) 
Rooftops(2019)
Not Enough(2018)
Laser(2018)
Ruby Bones(2017)

References

Citations

Bibliography

External links

Indie rock musical groups from New Jersey
Mint 400 Records artists
Musical groups established in 2015
2015 establishments in New Jersey